Harpalus capicola is a species of ground beetle in the subfamily Harpalinae. It was described by Pierre François Marie Auguste Dejean in 1829.

References

capicola
Beetles described in 1829